Fallen Angels is an Australian television series, aired by the ABC in 1997. Twenty episodes were produced, portraying a community legal centre in Endeavour Park, a fictional western suburb of Sydney, and the interesting clients represented by its overworked lawyers.

Cast
 Garry McDonald as Malcolm Lucas
 Celia De Burgh as Erica Michaels
 Brian Vriends as Nick Swan
 Leah Purcell as Sharon Walker
 Jeremy Ball as Warren Harvey  
 Eszter Marosszéky as Anita Malouf

See also
 List of Australian television series

References

External links
 

Australian drama television series
Australian Broadcasting Corporation original programming
1997 Australian television series debuts